"Sexy Sadie" is a song by the Beatles released in 1968.

Sexy Sadie may also refer to:
 Sexy Sadie (band), a Spanish pop rock group from the island of Majorca
 Susan Atkins, one of the Manson Family killers who went by the name "Sexy Sadie"